O'Dwyer (Irish: Ó Dubhuir), also known as Dwyer, Dyer or Maguire is one of Ireland’s oldest Gaelic noble or aristocratic houses, based most prominently in what is today County Tipperary. The name means "dark coloured", in reference to their progenitor Dubhuir mac Spealáin's hair colour.

Ancestry 
A claimed ancestor of the O'Dwyer clan was King Milesius of Spain, who according to legend conquered Ireland for the Gaels.

Documented paternal ancestors of the clan are of the Laigin, specifically, Cairbre Cluichechair, who was the son of Cú Corb, King of Leinster (himself the son of High King, Conchobar Abradruad). Cairbre Cluichechair moved into Munster, founding the Dál Cairbre Aradh at an early stage.

History 
There are accounts of the O'Dwyer family participating in the Battle of Clontarf and Irish clan warfare.

The O'Dwyers eventually emerged as Lords of Kilnamanagh in the High to Late Middle Ages, but they are not referenced by name as significant in the Annals of the Four Masters until the 15th century.

Along with the O'Carroll of Éile, the O'Kennedy of Ormond and the Mulryan of Owney, the O'Dwyers of Kilnamanagh were one of a cluster of regional Gaelic clan powers in the High Middle Ages in the area of what would one day become County Tipperary who held out against Anglicisation with the arrival of the Lordship of Ireland. They interplayed with newer Norman arrivals on their borders who became significant powers, especially the Butler Earls of Ormond. Clan members Philip O'Dwyer and Anthony O'Dwyer captured the Rock of Cashel in 1641 during the Irish Rebellion of 1641. Subsequently, following the Cromwellian War in Ireland, the clan were punished and dispossessed of much of their land under the Act for the Settlement of Ireland 1652. Some were removed to County Clare, while others chose exile as Wild Geese on the European Continent. A significant number of O'Dwyer men found service in armies of Bourbon France, the Habsburg monarchy (including General Count John O'Dwyer, Governor of Belgrade) and even Romanov Russia (providing an Admiral).

Throughout history, the O'Dwyers would prove themselves capable generals and soldiers, and would participate in many armed conflicts:

Castles
In  Kilnamanagh, the O'Dwyer built several castles, as part of their attempt to defend their lands. Today all of these castles are in ruin, but some of their remains can be seen in County Tipperary. Most were destroyed during the 17th century and all of them were confiscated during the times of Oliver Cromwell. These include:

 Ballysheeda Castle
 Ballagh Castle
 Clonyharp Castle
 Drumbane Castle
 Dundrum Castle (now the location of the 18th century Dumdrum House Hotel),
 Graigone Castle 
Killenure Castle (still largely intact)
 Milltown Castle.
 Moyaliffe Castle (now Moyaliffe House)

Naming conventions

List of people
The name has variants including Dwyer. People with the name O'Dwyer include:

Declan O'Dwyer (hurler) (b. 1987), Irish footballer
 Declan O'Dwyer (director), Irish television director
 Edmund Thomas O'Dwyer (1919–2005), Australian cricketer
 J. Mike O'Dwyer (b. ?), Australian weapon designer
 John Joseph O’Dwyer, 1st earl O’Dwyer, governor of Belgrade (b. ?)
 Joseph O'Dwyer (1841–1898), American physician
 Kelly O'Dwyer (born 1977), Australian politician
 Luke O'Dwyer (born 1980), Australian National Rugby League player
 Matt O'Dwyer (born 1972), American football player, NFL 1995–2005
 Michael O'Dwyer (1864–1940), administrator in British India

 Mick O'Dwyer (born 1936), Irish Gaelic football manager and former player
 Orla O'Dwyer (born 1998), Irish Australian rules footballer
 Paul O'Dwyer (1907–1998), American politician and lawyer
 Richard O'Dwyer (born 1988), British web developer
 Robert O'Dwyer (1862–1949), Irish composer
 Sean O'Dwyer (born 1941), Irish Guards officer
 Steve O'Dwyer (born 1982), American professional poker player
 Steven O'Dwyer (born 1966), Australian rules footballer
 William O'Dwyer (1890–1964), American politician, the 100th mayor of New York City

See also
 Dwyer (name)

References

Bibliography
 
 O'Dwyer, Sir Michael (1933) The O'Dwyers of Kilnamanagh: The History of an Irish Sept
 Callanan, Martin (1938) Records of four Tipperary septs: the O'Kennedys, O'Dwyers, O'Mulryans, O'Meaghers

External links
 O'Dwyer Clan Website
 O'Dwyer by Clann na hÉireann
 Dwyer in Ireland by John Grenham
 Contours of colonialism: Gaelic Ireland and the early colonial subject by John Morrissey
 An Irishman in Habsburg service - General Count John O'Dwyer, commander of Belgrade, 1718-1722 by Vladimir Abramovic

Surnames of Irish origin
Anglicised Irish-language surnames